Under the Tonto Rim may refer to:

 Under the Tonto Rim (novel), a 1926 novel by Zane Grey, or its film adaptations:
 Under the Tonto Rim (1928 film), starring Richard Arlen
 Under the Tonto Rim (1933 film), a 1933 film directed by Henry Hathaway
 Under the Tonto Rim (1947 film), a 1947 Western